Not to be confused with the region, Jabal Akroum

Akroum is a Sunni Muslim village located in the Akkar District in Lebanon. The area has mountains with many villages on it. It is located at an altitude of approximately 1087 meters. The approximate population of this area is 11,194.

References

External links
Akroum, localiban

Populated places in Akkar District
Sunni Muslim communities in Lebanon
Lebanon articles needing attention